Grote Markt is a RandstadRail station in central The Hague, Netherlands. It opened on 16 October 2004 as part of The Hague's new tram tunnel. The station is near by the Grote Marktstraat where's the main shopping centre from The Hague.

RandstadRail services 
The following services currently call at Grote Markt:

Tram Services

Bus services 
 25 (Grote Markt - Vrederust)
 51 (Grote Markt - Rijswijk - Delft railway station

Gallery 

RandstadRail stations in The Hague